Amado Nervo National Airport or Tepic Airport  is an international airport located at Tepic and the main airport in the Mexican state of Nayarit. Operated by Aeropuertos y Servicios Auxiliares, a federal government-owned corporation, it was Transportes Aereos de Nayarit's base before it ceased operations in 1999. It is named for the locally born poet Amado Nervo.

Information
The airport has one terminal with one concourse. 

During 2021, it handled 171,998 passengers and during 2021 it handled 205,617 passengers.

Airlines and destinations

Destinations map

Statistics

Passengers

See also 

List of the busiest airports in Mexico

References

External links
 Tepic Airport

Airports in Mexico
Tepic